Bank Street College of Education is a private school and graduate school in New York City. It consists of a graduate-only teacher training college and an independent nursery-through-8th-grade school. In 2020 the graduate school had about 65 full-time teaching staff and approximately 850 students, of which 87% were female.

History
The origins of the school lie in the Bureau of Educational Experiments, which was established in 1916 by Lucy Sprague Mitchell, her husband Wesley Clair Mitchell, and Harriet Merrill Johnson; Lucy Mitchell's cousin Elizabeth Sprague Coolidge provided financial support. The bureau was intended to foster research into, and development of, experimental and progressive education, and was influenced by the thinking of Edward Thorndike and John Dewey, both of whom Mitchell had studied with at Columbia University. The bureau was run by a council of twelve members, but Mitchell was its most influential figure until the 1950s. The name of the institution derives from its 1930–1971 location at 69 Bank Street in Greenwich Village.

In 1919 the bureau started a nursery school for children from fifteen to thirty-six months old; Harriet Johnson was the director. The school fed in to the Play School for three- to seven-year-olds run by Caroline Pratt; eight-year-olds were taught in a special class by members of the bureau.

Bank Street College of Education served as an academic consultant during development for Multiplication Rock, the first series of Schoolhouse Rocks!

In 1958, the college received a $1,000,000 grant from the Department of Health, Education and Welfare for a five-year study on how schools for younger children could improve mental health development.

Doug Knecht is the current Dean of Children's Programs and Head of the School for Children.

Academics

Accreditation
Since 1960 the school has been accredited by the Middle States Association of Colleges and Schools. Bank Street School for Children is accredited by the New York State Association of Independent Schools.

Head Start 
It is one of about hundred schools in the Manhattan area which participate in the national Head Start Program of the Early Childhood Learning & Knowledge Center of the U.S. Department of Health & Human Services.

Bank Street School for Children 
The Bank Street School for Children is a private coed preschool, elementary school, and middle school within the Bank Street College of Education. The school includes children in nursery through eighth grade, split into three divisions: the lower school, for nursery through first grade; the middle school, for second through fourth grades; and the upper school, for fifth through eighth grades. There are 451 children enrolled as students, approximately 50% of which are students of color. The instructors are often current or past students of Bank Street's graduate school, which shares a campus with the School for Children—including more than half of the teachers who are alumni.

The School for Children is accredited by the New York State Association of Independent Schools and is a member of the National Association of Independent Schools.

Bank Street Bookstore
The Bank Street Bookstore was an Upper West Side community bookstore that sold children's books and educational toys and games. It opened in 1970 in the lobby of Bank Street College, and moved to its second location on 112th Street and Broadway shortly thereafter. Its final location was on Broadway and West 107th Street until its closing in August 2020, due to the Coronavirus pandemic. The bookstore also hosted readings, daily story time, and celebrity events, with past guests including Stephen Colbert, Julianne Moore, and author Jeff Kinney.

Alumni

Graduate school

Bill Ayers, domestic terrorist and educator
Lee Bennett Hopkins, educator, poet, author, and anthologist 
Claudine K. Brown, director at the Smithsonian Institution, museum educator, artist
Margaret Wise Brown, author of classic children's books such as Goodnight Moon
Ruth Cohn, psychotherapist, educator, and poet
Rosina Fernhoff, Obie Award-winning theater actress
Robie Harris, award-winning children's book author
Trudie Lamb-Richmond, Schaghticoke Tribal Nation member and educator
Anne Mitchell, early childhood education consultant and co-founder of the Alliance on Early Childhood Finance
Shael Polakow-Suransky, current president and former Chief Academic Officer of the New York City Education Department
Miriam Roth, Israeli writer and scholar of children's books, kindergarten teacher, and educator
Julie Stevens, actress and acting coach
Dorothy Stoneman, founder and president of YouthBuild USA
Ellen Tarry, the first African-American picture book author
Edith Thacher Hurd, children's book writer with more than 70 books to her credit as well as a few collaborations with Margaret Wise Brown 
Lucy Wainwright Roche, singer-songwriter 
Sara Wilford, philanthropist and granddaughter of Franklin D. Roosevelt 
Valerie Wilson Wesley, author and former executive editor of Essence Magazine
Diane Wolkstein, folklorist and a former New York City official storyteller
Adam Gidwitz, author

School for Children 

 Liz Garbus, filmmaker
 Ben Lerer, CEO Thrillist Media Group
 Angelica Page, actress and filmmaker
 Ally Sheedy, actress
 Shuwanza Goff, Deputy Director of the Office of Legislative Affairs for President Joe Biden

References

External links

 
Early childhood education in the United States
Schools of education in New York (state)
Experimental schools
Harlem
Morningside Heights, Manhattan
Private universities and colleges in New York (state)
Universities and colleges in New York City
Educational institutions established in 1916
Universities and colleges in Manhattan
Progressive colleges
Private elementary schools in Manhattan
Private middle schools in Manhattan
Private high schools in Manhattan
1916 establishments in New York City
Schools in Harlem